CES MMA (Classic Entertainment & Sports) is a mixed martial arts promotional firm based out of Providence, Rhode Island founded by boxing promoter Jimmy Burchfield Sr. It promoted the first sanctioned professional mixed martial event in the state of Rhode Island on September 17, 2010, at Twin River Casino.

Since its inception, CES MMA has promoted and developed the careers of several current and former Ultimate Fighting Championships (UFC) contenders, including Chuck O'Neil, Tateki Matsuda, Charles Rosa, Alex Karalexis, Thomas Egan, Dominique Steele, Rob Font and Ricardo Funch.

Other UFC veterans to appear on CES MMA cards include David Loiseau and Drew Fickett. Several CES MMA alums have also made successful transitions to Bellator MMA, most notably Brennan Ward, who won his first three professional fights under the guidance of CES MMA before winning Bellator's middleweight tournament in 2013.

In October 2012, CES MMA promoted its first pay-per-view event at the Dunkin' Donuts Center in Providence, featuring the professional MMA debut of former WWE wrestler Dave Bautista, before signing a multi-year broadcast deal with AXS TV in September 2014 which ended in 2019.

In January 2019 CES MMA started airing live events on UFC Fight Pass with the debut event on UFC Fight Pass being CES 54.

History

Inaugural event

CES MMA held its first event September 17, 2010, at Twin River Casino in Lincoln, Rhode Island, the state's first sanctioned professional mixed martial arts event. The card featured seven bouts, including the main event between Rhode Island native and former World Extreme Cagefighting (WEC) and Reality Fighting vet Mike Campbell and Magno Almeida of Woburn, Massachusetts. Almeida won by rear naked choke submission at the 4:03 mark of the opening round.

Titled "First Blood," CES MMA's inaugural event also featured the debuts of eventual CES MMA fixtures Luis Felix, Pete Jeffrey and Saul Almeida. Also on the undercard, heavyweight Parker Porter defeated Lee Beane by first-round submission (rear naked choke) and Rhode Island vet Mat Santos won his farewell bout following a four-year layoff by defeating Stephen Stengel via kneebar submission in the opening round.

Early success

Following its inaugural event, CES MMA successfully promoted seven events between 2010 and 2011, including its Foxwoods Resort Casino debut on Oct. 22, 2010. The event featured a main event rematch between Felix and Massachusetts native Joe DeChaves, who also fought on the undercard of "First Blood" the previous month. DeChaves avenged his September loss with a split-decision win, one of nine bouts on the card.

CES MMA returned to Twin River on Dec. 2, 2010 for the first of 10 consecutive events at its home venue. Massachusetts native Dan Lauzon, the brother of UFC vet Joe Lauzon, defeated fellow Massachusetts native Damien Trites in the main event. The undercard also featured the CES MMA debuts of Bellator MMA vet Greg Rebello, Rhode Island's Ruben Rey, Tyson Chartier, Matsuda and Bellator MMA vet Tiawan Howard of Cleveland, Ohio, who would make another appearance with CES MMA a year later.

CES MMA made headlines in 2011 with the signing of former UFC and WEC vet Alex Karalexis, a Boston, Massachusetts native. Karalexis made his CES MMA debut June 10, 2011, at Twin River and lost a controversial split decision to Howard in the main event.

Later that year the promotion crowned its first champion at its November 18 event, titled "Undisputed." Pawtucket, Rhode Island veteran Todd Chattelle won the promotion's inaugural middleweight championship by defeating Massachusetts native Brett Oteri via guillotine choke submission in the opening round of a scheduled five-round bout.

Having established itself as New England's most prolific promotional firm, CES MMA was eventually named the Boston Herald Local MMA Promotion of the Year in 2011. Patrick Sullivan earned Best Matchmaker honors and the June 10 event featuring the Karalexis-Howard main event was named the region's best local card of the year. After finishing 4–0 in 2011 and capturing the CES MMA middleweight title, Chattelle won the Herald's Comeback Fighter of the Year award. CES MMA also announced three additional signings in 2011, including Chattelle, Saul Almeida and Boston's Scott Rehm.

Pay-per-view debut

On October 6, 2012, CES MMA promoted its first pay-per-view event in association with June Entertainment at the Dunkin' Donuts Center, featuring the MMA debut of  Dave Bautista. The event, titled "Real Pain," was made available through DirecTV and featured 13 bouts, including former UFC contenders Loiseau, Howard and Stevens.

Bautista made quick work of his opponent, Vince Lucero, earning a knockout win at the 4:03 mark of the opening round due to excessive unanswered punches. The Boston native Howard, who had previously won the CES MMA middleweight championship by beating Chattelle in April in his CES MMA debut, defeated Brett Chism via second-round knockout on the undercard for his third consecutive win with CES MMA. Chattelle suffered his second consecutive loss just 27 seconds into his bout with Chandler Holderness due to a knockout from a flying knee while Felix defeated Stevens by unanimous decision.

Campbell earned a unanimous decision win over Philadelphia, Pennsylvania vet Gemiyale Adkins and Loiseau stopped Chris McNally via first-round knockout at the 2:30 mark. Ward made his final appearance with CES MMA on the undercard, defeating Shedrick Goodridge by knockout 2:36 into the opening round.

Championship expansion

CES MMA kicked off 2013 by introducing its second title, the CES MMA lightweight championship. Campbell won the crown on February 1, 2013, at Twin River by defeating former Spanish Olympic boxer and Barcelona, Spain native Abner Lloveras by unanimous decision. It would coincidentally be the final fight of Campbell's career. Titled "Undisputed 2,"' the card was a sequel to CES MMA's "Undisputed" event in 2011 in which Chattelle won the promotion's inaugural middleweight championship.

"Undisputed 2" was also noteworthy as the first CES MMA appearance of Font, the Boston bantamweight who earned an upset win over Saul Almeida on the undercard, beginning a stretch of six consecutive wins with CES MMA before making his UFC debut in July 2014. Font would eventually become the second fighter under CES MMA's guidance to return or advance to the UFC, preceded by Howard, who won five consecutive fights by knockout with CES MMA before returning to the UFC in August 2013.

Font would also go on to capture CES MMA's inaugural featherweight championship with a first-round knockout win over Connecticut native Chris Foster on August 9, 2013, at Twin River in the main event of "Gold Rush."

20th event

With four events already in the books for 2013, CES MMA closed out the year at Twin River with its 20th show, titled, "CES MMA XX." It marked the first time CES MMA began numbering its events chronologically.

"CES MMA XX" featured 10 bouts. Font defeated Matt DiMarcantonio by unanimous decision in the main event. Woonsocket, Rhode Island bantamweight Andre Soukhamthath won his seventh consecutive bout under the guidance of CES MMA on the undercard by defeating Corey Simmons via first-round TKO. Soukhamthath also tied Chattelle as the promotion's winningest fighter with seven victories. Rebello, Felix, Rosa and Oteri also won on the undercard.

AXS TV debut

CES MMA introduced its fourth championship on March 14, 2014, at Twin River when Boston heavyweight John Johnston defeated former UFC challenger Josh Hendricks by knockout at the 4:36 mark of the opening round due to excessive punches.

The heavyweight title bout was the co-feature of "CES MMA XXII," also noteworthy for Fickett's first and final appearance with CES MMA. The longtime UFC vet challenged Felix, who earned the biggest win of his career by knocking out Fickett with a head kick at 2:29 of the opening round.

On August 8, 2014, at Twin River, CES MMA made its long-awaited AXS TV debut with "CES MMA XXV." Former The Ultimate Fighter reality television alum Julian Lane defeated Felix in the main event to capture the CES MMA lightweight crown vacated by Campbell. Lane earned the victory via guillotine choke submission at the 4:56 mark of the third round. The stage had been set between Lane and Felix when the two were supposed to fight at "CES MMA XXIV," but Felix was forced to withdraw due to an injury.

The televised portion of "CES MMA XXV" featured six bouts, including a second-round knockout win for Brazilian Gil de Freitas over George Sheppard and Matsuda's submission win over Robbie Leroux. Matsuda would make his UFC debut a month later. Rosa also fought his final bout with CES MMA on the main card, defeating Jake Constant via first-round armbar submission. Rosa went on to face Dennis Siver in his UFC debut two months later. Adkins returned to Twin River at "CES MMA XXV" and defeated Rhode Island's Nate Andrews by unanimous decision.

Six weeks later, AXS TV announced it had signed a multi-year broadcast deal with CES MMA. On October 10, 2014, CES MMA crowned a champion in a new weight class when O'Neil won the promotion's inaugural welterweight title with a second-round armbar submission over fellow UFC alum Ricardo Funch in the main event of "CES MMA XXVI" at Twin River. The promotion's reigning heavyweight champion Johnston also won that night via first-round knockout over Keith Bell and subsequently announced his retirement at the age of 43, ending his career with a perfect 7–0 record with all seven wins coming by knockout.

The first event of the new broadcast deal with AXS TV took place January 30, 2015, with "CES MMA XXVII." Lane defended his CES MMA lightweight title with a split-decision win over Boston's Lucas Cruz and O'Neil, a former The Ultimate Fighter alum, knocked out Emmanuel Walo 11 seconds into the opening round of their main-event welterweight bout.

On June 12, 2015, the promotion's welterweight title changed hands at "CES MMA XXIX" when Cincinnati veteran Dominique Steele defeated O'Neil by unanimous decision, 48–47, 48–47, 49–46, in the five-round main event on AXS TV. Rebello earned a knockout win over Tyler King on the main card and former Bellator standout Matthew Bessette knocked out Khama Worthy of Pittsburgh in his CES MMA debut. Steele vacated the belt in July to fight on "UFC on Fox 16" in Chicago as a replacement for the injured Antonio Braga Neto in a preliminary welterweight bout against Zak Cummings.

CES MMA celebrated its 30th show on Aug. 14, 2015 with "CES MMA XXX" at Twin River. The main event featured the long-awaited rematch between Lane and Felix for Lane's CES MMA lightweight title. This time, Felix won by unanimous decision, 49–46, 49–46, 48–47, to capture the title and become the promotion's third lightweight champion. "CES MMA XXX" also featured a showdown between Lenny Wheeler and Bessette, which Wheeler won by knockout 39 seconds into the opening round.

CES MMA 53 was the last CES MMA event on AXS TV as the multi year contract ended in 2019.

Current champions

Events

References

External links
Official site 

Mixed martial arts organizations
Events in Providence, Rhode Island